Pitonga is a monotypic genus of  intertidal spiders containing the single species, Pitonga woolowa. It was first described by V. T. Davies in 1984, and has only been found in Northern Australia.

References

Desidae
Spiders described in 1984
Spiders of Australia
Taxa named by Valerie Todd Davies